Mich dürstet is an East German film. The film was directed by Austrian socialist filmmaker Karl Paryla for the state-owned DEFA film studio. It was released in 1956. The film was based on a 1946 short story by Walter Gorrisch, "Um Spaniens Freiheit" (a story about the Spanish Civil War); Gorrisch also wrote the screenplay.

Cast
 Edwin Marian - Pablo
 Isabell Carenato - Magdalena
 Harry Hindemith - Taga
 Uwe-Jens Pape - Carlos
 Maria Wendt - Pilar
 Curt Paulus - Jacinto
 Gert Beinemann - Pedro Bernardo
 Rolf Ludwig - Cerefino
 Harald Jopt - Lopez
 Charles Hans Vogt - Rodriguez
 Karl Block - Baptiste
 Friedrich Wolf - Gustavo
 Elfriede Florin - Barbara
 Else Korén - Rosita
 Rolf Ripperger - Edgar

External links

External links
 

1956 films
East German films
1950s German-language films
Spanish Civil War films
1950s German films
German war drama films
1950s war drama films
German black-and-white films